Vuk Lazović (born 10 March 1988) is Montenegrin handball player for RK Partizan and the Montenegro national team.

Club career
Lazović started out at Partizan and made his Serbian Handball Super League debut in its inaugural 2006–07 season. He was later loaned to Radnički Kragujevac for the 2008–09 season. After a loan spell with Zaječar, Lazović returned to Partizan until the end of the 2009–10 season.

International career
After competing for Serbia in youth tournaments, Lazović accepted a call-up to represent Montenegro at senior level in 2014. He made his debut for the national team in 2015. Later on, Lazović participated in four European Championships (2016, 2018, 2020 and 2022) and one World Championship (2023).

Personal life
Lazović is the son of late actor Danilo Lazović. He is married to fellow handball player Barbara Lazović (née Varlec).

Honours
Partizan
 Serbian Handball Cup: 2006–07, 2007–08
Vardar
 Macedonian Handball Super League: 2012–13
Vojvodina
 Serbian Handball Super League: 2014–15
 Serbian Handball Cup: 2014–15
 Serbian Handball Super Cup: 2014

References

External links
 EHF record

1988 births
Living people
Handball players from Belgrade
Serbian people of Montenegrin descent
Montenegrin people of Serbian descent
Serbian male handball players
Montenegrin male handball players
RK Partizan players
RK Vardar players
RK Crvena zvezda players
RK Vojvodina players
TuS Nettelstedt-Lübbecke players
Handball-Bundesliga players
Expatriate handball players
Serbian expatriate sportspeople in Slovenia
Serbian expatriate sportspeople in North Macedonia
Montenegrin expatriate sportspeople in Germany
Montenegrin expatriate sportspeople in Romania
Montenegrin expatriate sportspeople in South Korea